The Closet is a 2007 Hong Kong film directed by Kin-Nam Cho.

Plot
Due to his rebellious nature, Lo Fei suffered a traumatic childhood with abuse and maltreatment from his bad-tempered but famous sculptor father. Apart from receiving corporal punishment and verbal abuse, he was often locked up inside the wardrobe. The dark childhood turned Lo into a weirdo frequently tormented by the pain of childhood memories as well as hallucination of his dead father. Lo betrayed his father's artistic career and chose to become a magician and performer of extremities instead, to prove his own capabilities. During one of his death-defying show, Lo was seriously wounded by shocks of his childhood nightmares. Not knowing the truth behind it, his girlfriend Lei thought he was stretching his physical strength too far. She therefore took him to a quiet retreat in the suburb to recuperate. On a windy moonless night, the five of them went through a terrifying catastrophe.

Cast
Francis Ng as Lo Fei
Yang Chih-fei as Lei Hiu-king
Michelle Ye as Mang Ping
Cheung Siu-Fai as Ngok Fung

External links
The Closet at SinaHK

2007 films
2007 horror films
Hong Kong psychological horror films
2000s Cantonese-language films
Hong Kong horror films
2000s psychological horror films
2000s Hong Kong films